Franklin Patrick Herbert Jr. (October 8, 1920February 11, 1986) was an American science fiction author best known for the 1965 novel Dune and its five sequels. Though he became famous for his novels, he also wrote short stories and worked as a newspaper journalist, photographer, book reviewer, ecological consultant, and lecturer.

The Dune saga, set in the distant future, and taking place over millennia, explores complex themes, such as the long-term survival of the human species, human evolution, planetary science and ecology, and the intersection of religion, politics, economics and power in a future where humanity has long since developed interstellar travel and settled many thousands of worlds. Dune is the best-selling science fiction novel of all time, and the entire series is considered to be among the classics of the genre.

Biography

Early life
Frank Patrick Herbert Jr. was born on October 8, 1920, in Tacoma, Washington, to Frank Patrick Herbert Sr. and Eileen (née McCarthy) Herbert. His rural upbringing involved spending a lot of his youth on the Olympic and Kitsap Peninsulas. He was fascinated by books and could read much of the newspaper before the age of five, had an excellent memory, and learned things quickly. He had an early interest in photography, and bought a Kodak box camera at age ten, a new folding camera in his early teens, and a color film camera in the mid-1930s. Because of an impoverished home environment, largely due to the Great Depression, he left home in 1938 to live with an aunt and uncle in Salem, Oregon. He enrolled in high school at Salem High School (now North Salem High School), where he graduated the next year. In 1939 he lied about his age to get his first newspaper job at the Glendale Star. Herbert then returned to Salem in 1940 where he worked for the Oregon Statesman newspaper (now Statesman Journal) in a variety of positions, including photographer.

Herbert married Flora Lillian Parkinson in San Pedro, California, in 1941. They had one daughter, Penelope (b. February 16, 1942), and divorced in 1943. During 1942, after the U.S. entry into World War II, he served in the Navy's Seabees for six months as a photographer, but suffered an accidental head injury and was given a medical discharge. Herbert subsequently moved to Portland, Oregon where he reported for The Oregon Journal.

After the war, Herbert attended the University of Washington, where he met Beverly Ann Stuart at a creative writing class in 1946. They were the only students who had sold any work for publication; Herbert had sold two pulp adventure stories to magazines, the first to Esquire in 1945, and Stuart had sold a story to Modern Romance magazine. They married in Seattle in 1946, and had two sons, Brian (b. 1947) and Bruce (1951–1993). In 1949 Herbert and his wife moved to California to work on the Santa Rosa Press-Democrat. Here they befriended the psychologists Ralph and Irene Slattery. The Slatterys introduced Herbert to the work of several thinkers who would influence his writing, including Freud, Jung, Jaspers and Heidegger; they also familiarized Herbert with Zen Buddhism.

Herbert never graduated from university. According to his son Brian, he wanted to study only what interested him and so did not complete the required curriculum. He returned to journalism and worked at the Seattle Star and the Oregon Statesman. He was a writer and editor for the San Francisco Examiner California Living magazine for a decade.

In a 1973 interview, Herbert stated that he had been reading science fiction "about ten years" before he began writing in the genre, and he listed his favorite authors as H. G. Wells, Robert A. Heinlein, Poul Anderson and Jack Vance.

Herbert's first science fiction story, "Looking for Something", was published in the April 1952 issue of Startling Stories, then a monthly edited by Samuel Mines. Three more of his stories appeared in 1954 issues of Astounding Science Fiction and Amazing Stories. His career as a novelist began in 1955 with the serial publication of Under Pressure in Astounding from November 1955; afterward it was issued as a book by Doubleday titled The Dragon in the Sea. The story explored sanity and madness in the environment of a 21st-century submarine and predicted worldwide conflicts over oil consumption and production. It was a critical success but not a major commercial one. During this time Herbert also worked as a speechwriter for Republican senator Guy Cordon.

Dune 

Herbert began researching Dune in 1959. He was able to devote himself wholeheartedly to his writing career because his wife returned to work full-time as an advertising writer for department stores, becoming the breadwinner during the 1960s. The novel Dune was published in 1965, which spearheaded the Dune franchise. He later told Willis E. McNelly that the novel originated when he was assigned to write a magazine article about sand dunes in the Oregon Dunes near Florence, Oregon. He got overinvolved and ended up with far more raw material than needed for an article. The article was never written, but it planted the seed that led to Dune. Another significant source of inspiration for Dune was Herbert's experiences with psilocybin and his hobby of cultivating mushrooms, according to mycologist Paul Stamets's account.

Dune took six years of research and writing to complete and was much longer than other commercial science fiction of the time. Analog (the renamed Astounding, still edited by John W. Campbell) published it in two parts comprising eight installments, "Dune World" from December 1963 and "Prophet of Dune" in 1965. It was then rejected by nearly twenty book publishers. One editor prophetically wrote, "I might be making the mistake of the decade, but..."

Sterling E. Lanier, an editor of Chilton Book Company (known mainly for its auto-repair manuals) had read the Dune serials and offered a $7,500 advance plus future royalties for the rights to publish them as a hardcover book. Herbert rewrote much of his text. Dune was soon a critical success. It won the Nebula Award for Best Novel in 1965 and shared the Hugo Award in 1966 with ...And Call Me Conrad by Roger Zelazny.

Dune was not an immediate bestseller. By 1968 Herbert had made $20,000 from it, far more than most science fiction novels of the time were generating, but not enough to let him take up full-time writing. However, the publication of Dune did open doors for him. He was the Seattle Post-Intelligencer education writer from 1969 to 1972 and lecturer in general studies and interdisciplinary studies at the University of Washington (1970–1972). He worked in Vietnam and Pakistan as a social and ecological consultant in 1972. In 1973 he was director-photographer of the television show The Tillers.

By the end of 1972, Herbert had retired from newspaper writing and became a full-time fiction writer. During the 1970s and 1980s, he enjoyed considerable commercial success as an author. He divided his time between homes in Hawaii and Washington's Olympic Peninsula; his home in Port Townsend on the peninsula was intended to be an "ecological demonstration project".
 During this time he wrote numerous books and pushed ecological and philosophical ideas. He continued his Dune saga with Dune Messiah (1969), Children of Dune (1976), God Emperor of Dune (1981), Heretics of Dune (1984) and Chapterhouse: Dune (1985). Herbert planned to write a seventh novel to conclude the series, but his death in 1986 left storylines unresolved.

Other works by Herbert include The Godmakers (1972), The Dosadi Experiment (1977), The White Plague (1982) and the books he wrote in partnership with Bill Ransom: The Jesus Incident (1979), The Lazarus Effect (1983) and The Ascension Factor (1988), which were sequels to Herbert's 1966 novel Destination: Void. He also helped launch the career of Terry Brooks with a very positive review of Brooks' first novel, The Sword of Shannara, in 1977.

Success, family changes, and death 
Herbert's change in fortune was shadowed by tragedy. In 1974, his wife Beverly underwent an operation for cancer. She lived ten more years, but her health was adversely affected by the surgery. During this period, Herbert was the featured speaker at the Octocon II science fiction convention held at the El Rancho Tropicana in Santa Rosa, California, in October 1978. In 1979, he met anthropologist James Funaro with whom he conceived the Contact Conference. Beverly Herbert died on February 7, 1984. Herbert completed and published Heretics of Dune that year. In his afterword to 1985's Chapterhouse: Dune, Herbert included a dedication to Beverly.

1984 was a tumultuous year in Herbert's life. During this same year of his wife's death, his career took off with the release of David Lynch's film version of Dune. Despite high expectations, a big-budget production design and an A-list cast, the movie drew mostly poor reviews in the United States. However, despite a disappointing response in the US, the film was a critical and commercial success in Europe and Japan.

In 1985, after Beverly's death, Herbert married his former Putnam representative Theresa Shackleford. The same year he published Chapterhouse: Dune, which tied up many of the saga's story threads. This would be Herbert's final single work (the collection Eye was published that year, and Man of Two Worlds was published in 1986). He died of a massive pulmonary embolism while recovering from surgery for pancreatic cancer on February 11, 1986, in Madison, Wisconsin, age 65.

Criticism of government 
Herbert was a strong critic of the Soviet Union. He was a distant relative of the Republican senator Joseph McCarthy, whom he referred to as "Cousin Joe". However, he was appalled to learn of McCarthy's blacklisting of suspected communists from working in certain careers and believed that he was endangering essential freedoms of citizens of the United States. Herbert believed that governments lie to protect themselves and that, following the Watergate scandal, President Richard Nixon had unwittingly taught an important lesson in not trusting government. Herbert also opposed American involvement in the war in Vietnam.

In Chapterhouse: Dune, he wrote:

Ideas and themes
Frank Herbert used his science fiction novels to explore complex ideas involving philosophy, religion, psychology, politics and ecology. The underlying thrust of his work was a fascination with the question of human survival and evolution. Herbert has attracted a sometimes fanatical fan base, many of whom have tried to read everything he wrote, fiction or non-fiction, and see Herbert as something of an authority on the subject matters of his books. Indeed, such was the devotion of some of his readers that Herbert was at times asked if he was founding a cult, something he was very much against.

There are a number of key themes in Herbert's work:
 A concern with leadership. He explored the human tendency to slavishly follow charismatic leaders. He delved into both the flaws and potentials of bureaucracy and government.
 Herbert was among the first science fiction authors to popularize ideas about ecology and systems thinking. He stressed the need for humans to think both systematically and long-term.
 The relationship between religion, politics and power.
 Human survival and evolution: Herbert writes of the Fremen, the Sardaukar, and the Dosadi, who are molded by their terrible living conditions into dangerous super races.
 Human possibilities and potential: Herbert offered Mentats, the Bene Gesserit and the Bene Tleilax as different visions of human potential.
 The nature of sanity and madness. Frank Herbert was interested in the work of Thomas Szasz and the anti-psychiatry movement. Often, Herbert poses the question, "What is sane?", and while there are clearly insane behaviors and psychopathies as evinced by characters (Piter De Vries for instance), it is often suggested that normal and abnormal are relative terms which humans are sometimes ill-equipped to apply to one another, especially on the basis of statistical regularity.
 The possible effects and consequences of consciousness-altering chemicals, such as the spice in the Dune saga, as well as the "Jaspers" fungus in The Santaroga Barrier, and the Kelp in the Destination: Void sequence.
 How language shapes thought. More specifically, Herbert was influenced by Alfred Korzybski's General Semantics. Algis Budrys wrote that his knowledge of language and linguistics "is worth at least one PhD and the Chair of Philology at a good New England college".
 Learning, teaching, and thinking.

Frank Herbert refrained from offering his readers formulaic answers to many of the questions he explored.

Status and influence on science fiction
Dune and the Dune saga constitute one of the world's best-selling science fiction series and novels; Dune in particular has received widespread critical acclaim, winning the Nebula Award in 1965 and sharing the Hugo Award in 1966, and is frequently considered one of the best science fiction novels ever, if not the best. Locus subscribers voted it the all-time best SF novel in 1975, again in 1987, and the best "before 1990" in 1998.

Dune is considered a landmark novel for a number of reasons:
 Dune is a landmark of soft science fiction. Herbert deliberately suppressed technology in his Dune universe so that he could address the future of humanity, rather than the future of humanity's technology. Dune considers the way humans and their institutions might change over time.
 Frank Herbert was a great popularizer of scientific ideas; many of his fans credit Frank Herbert for introducing them to philosophy and psychology. In Dune, he helped popularize the term ecology. Gerald Jonas explains in The New York Times Book Review: "So completely did Mr. Herbert work out the interactions of man and beast and geography and climate that Dune became the standard for an emerging subgenre of 'ecological' science fiction."
 Dune is considered an epic example of literary world-building. The Library Journal reports that "Dune is to science fiction what The Lord of the Rings is to fantasy". Arthur C. Clarke is quoted as making a similar statement on the back cover of a paper edition of Dune. Frank Herbert imagined every facet of his creation. He lovingly included glossaries, quotes, documents, and histories, to bring his universe alive to his readers. No science fiction novel before it had so vividly realized life on another world.

Herbert never again equalled the critical acclaim he received for Dune. Neither his sequels to Dune nor any of his other books won a Hugo or Nebula Award, although almost all of them were New York Times Best Sellers.

Malcolm Edwards wrote, in the Encyclopedia of Science Fiction:

The Science Fiction Hall of Fame inducted Herbert in 2006.

California State University, Fullerton's Pollack Library has several of Herbert's draft manuscripts of Dune and other works, with the author's notes, in their Frank Herbert Archives.

Metro Parks Tacoma built Dune Peninsula and the Frank Herbert Trail at Point Defiance Park in July 2019 to honor the hometown writer.

Bibliography

Posthumously published works 
Beginning in 2012, Herbert's estate and WordFire Press have released four previously unpublished novels in e-book and paperback formats: High-Opp (2012), Angels' Fall (2013), A Game of Authors (2013), and A Thorn in the Bush (2014).

In recent years, Frank Herbert's son Brian Herbert and author Kevin J. Anderson have added to the Dune franchise, using notes left behind by Frank Herbert and discovered over a decade after his death. Brian Herbert and Anderson have written three prequel trilogies (Prelude to Dune, Legends of Dune and Great Schools of Dune) exploring the history of the Dune universe before the events of the original novel, two novels that take place between novels of the original Dune sequels (with plans for more), as well as two post-Chapterhouse Dune novels that complete the original series (Hunters of Dune and Sandworms of Dune) based on Frank Herbert's own Dune 7 outline.

References

Sources

Further reading
 Allen, L. David. Cliffs Notes on Herbert's Dune & Other Works. Lincoln, NE: Cliffs Notes, 1975. 
 Clarke, Jason. SparkNotes: Dune, Frank Herbert. New York: Spark Publishing, 2002. 
 
 Herbert, Brian. Dreamer of Dune : The Biography of Frank Herbert. New York: Tor Books, 2003. 
 Levack, Daniel JH; Willard, Mark. Dune Master: A Frank Herbert Bibliography. Westport, CT: Meckler, 1988. 
 McNelly, Dr. Willis E. (ed.) The Dune Encyclopedia. New York: Berkeley Publishing Group, 1984. 
 Miller, David M. Starmont Reader's Guide 5: Frank Herbert. Mercer Island, WA: Starmont, 1980. 
 O'Reilly, Timothy. Frank Herbert. New York: Frederick Ungar, 1980.
 O'Reilly, Timothy (ed.) The Maker of Dune. New York: Berkeley Publishing Group, 1987.

External links

 Official website for Brian Herbert and Kevin Anderson
 Frank Herbert SF Hall of Fame induction (Kevin Anderson report with his speech)
 
 
 1984 interview with L. A. Reader: part 1, 2, 3
 Frank Herbert on the Literature Map

Biography and criticism
 Frank Herbert biography at the Encyclopedia of Science Fiction
 Arabic and Islamic themes in Frank Herbert's Dune novels
 Study by Tim O'Reilly of Frank Herbert's work up to the Jesus Incident; one of the more in-depth studies of Frank Herbert's thoughts and ideas
 Article on the inspirations for Dune
 "Frank Herbert, the Dune Man" -(Frederik Pohl)
 "Frank Herbert, the Dune Man, Part 2"

Bibliography and works
 
 
 
 
 
 
 
 

20th-century American novelists
American environmentalists
American male novelists
United States Navy personnel of World War II
American science fiction writers
Converts to Buddhism from Christianity
American Zen Buddhists
Deaths from cancer in Wisconsin
Deaths from pancreatic cancer
Deaths from pulmonary embolism
Hugo Award-winning writers
Journalists from Oregon
Constructed language creators
Nebula Award winners
North Salem High School (Salem, Oregon) alumni
Science Fiction Hall of Fame inductees
University of Washington alumni
Writers from Port Townsend, Washington
Writers from Salem, Oregon
Writers from Seattle
Writers from Tacoma, Washington
1920 births
1986 deaths
San Francisco Examiner people
American male short story writers
20th-century American short story writers
Activists from California
20th-century American male writers
Novelists from Washington (state)
Novelists from Oregon
American male non-fiction writers
Seattle Post-Intelligencer people
Seabees
20th-century American journalists
American male journalists
American war photographers